Ben Mandelson (born 6 October 1953, in Everton, Liverpool, England) is an English world musician, and also manager and producer.

Punk and new wave years
In the mid-1970s, Mandelson was a student at Bolton Institute of Technology (now Bolton University), where he met Howard Devoto, future Buzzcocks and Magazine frontman. When punk emerged, he formed a band called Amazorblades, being the group's guitarist.

In 1981, he joined Howard Devoto's band Magazine, replacing Robin Simon (who previously replaced a solid member of that band, John McGeoch) and playing on their last album Magic, Murder and the Weather. He is Jewish.

World music years
In 1982 as Hijaz Mustapha, he started playing with Lu Edmonds a.k.a. Uncle Patrel Mustapha Bin Mustapha, which led to the formation of 3 Mustaphas 3, a band that was active throughout the 1980s and into the 1990s.

He was founding director, in 1994, of the world music fair WOMEX.

In 2009, together with Justin Adams and, again, Lu Edmonds, Mandelson formed the band Les Triaboliques and released the debut album Rivermudtwilight.

References

External links
  Information about Ben Mandelson
 "Hijaz (Ben Mandelson) Journal", Ian A. Anderson, Folk Roots No. 213 (Vol. 22 No. 9) March 2001, pp. 44–45, 47, 49. 
 

1953 births
English male guitarists
Alumni of the University of Bolton
Living people
Magazine (band) members
Musicians from Liverpool
British post-punk musicians
British world music musicians
English record producers
The Mekons members